Brian Calzini  is an American metalcore vocalist. He formed bands Paddock Park, Sleeping with Sirens and We Are Defiance, his current band.

Early life
Calzini is also known as Brian John Williams.

Music career
Williams's musical career began when he started recording a song named I´ll Swing My Fists together with Tom Denney formerly of A Day To Remember. Williams uploaded the song to his MySpace profile and started a solo musical project called '"Paddock Park". He later found a live band to perform his songs live and formed the band as Paddock Park, with whom he recorded his first song "I'll Swing My Fists" for their debut EP False Hope, in 2007. The band was later signed by Eulogy Recordings, where they released their first full-length album A Hiding Place for Fake Friends, which featured a re-recording of the same song. In 2009, the band was disbanded.

Almost immediately after Paddock Park's end, Williams went on to form Sleeping With Sirens with former member of Uprising Records band Broadway, Nick Trombino. Finding members from Orlando, Florida and a singer Kellin Quinn from Oregon. Williams spent two weeks with the band in Orlando, Florida writing together in a studio then went on to record The Bomb.com and Big Gulps. Williams soon after recording parted ways with the band with Quinn taking over all vocals. He has stated in interviews Quinn wanted the band to go in a different direction and there was no harsh feeling between him and former bandmates. Soon after Williams went on to create his current band We Are Defiance. The band recorded a few songs in 2009, including a cover of B.o.B's popular song "Airplanes", featuring Tom Denney and former bandmate Kellin Quinn (Sleeping with Sirens). In 2010, the band started touring extensively as well as working on their debut album with producer Tom Denney. We Are Defiance signed to Tragic Hero Records and released their debut album called Trust in Few which was released worldwide. Trust In Few was released on March 15, 2011. The album peaked at 28 on Billboard Heatseekers for one week.

Film 
In 2022 Calzini played himself in the Netflix series The Most Hated Man on the Internet.

Influences
Williams has stated in interviews his music influences range from acoustic music, pop, and metal.

Discography
Paddock Park
 2007: With False Hope (EP) 
 2008: A Hiding Place for Fake Friends (Eulogy Recordings)

Sleeping with Sirens
2009: Bomb(dot)com, Big Gulps

We Are Defiance
 2011: Trust in Few (Tragic Hero Records)

References

External links
 
 Interview on Highwiredaze.com
 Brian Calzini Biography at Spirit of Metal webzine

Living people
21st-century American male singers
21st-century American singers
Year of birth missing (living people)